Brian Kuklick (born May 23, 1976) is an American former quarterback for the Orlando Rage of the XFL.

Early life and education 
A star top-ranked football player in Pennsylvania, Kuklick became a two-sport athlete at Wake Forest University. In addition to playing as a quarterback, Kuklick played as a member of the Wake Forest Demon Deacons baseball team as a freshman. He drafted in the 5th round by the New York Mets in the June 1994 free agent draft. Kuklick graduated with a Bachelor of Arts in Communications.

Career 
In 1999, Kuklick signed and attended training camp with the Dallas Cowboys as an undrafted free agent. He then attended several New England Patriots mini-camps before being released in May, 2000. 

Kuklick became a member of the Orlando Rage during the XFL's debut season. The league was a financial failure, and the XFL ceased operations in May 2001. After retiring from football, Kuklick became an account manager at Ikon Office Solutions in Charlotte, North Carolina.

References

External links
 Wake Forest Demon Deacons bio

Further reading

1976 births
Living people
Players of American football from Pennsylvania
American football quarterbacks
Wake Forest Demon Deacons football players
Orlando Rage players